Union Sportive Quevillaise-Rouen Métropole, known as US Quevilly-Rouen, US Quevilly, QRM, Quevilly-Rouen, or simply Quevilly, is a football club based in Le Petit-Quevilly in the Métropole Rouen Normandie, France. The club plays in Ligue 2 and hosts its home matches at the Stade Robert Diochon, which has a capacity of 12,018.

Founded in 1902, the team reached the Coupe de France final in 1927 and its performances in cup and amateur competitions saw it invited to Division 2 in 1970. It was relegated two years later for not being able to afford lighting, being dissolved and re-entering in the tenth tier in 1978. The team reached a cup semi-final in 2010 and a final in 2012, and returned to the second tier in 2017–18 and 2021–present.

At the request of local government, Quevilly joined with historic rivals FC Rouen to form US Quevilly-Rouen Métropole in 2015, with Quevilly providing the president, manager and most players while playing at Rouen's stadium and using their red colour instead of Quevilly's yellow and black. Both teams continue to exist independently, and Rouen ended its collaboration in 2018.

History

Foundation, first cup final and decline
The club was founded as US Quevilly in 1902 by Amable Lozai and Jules Manneville, two former members of a hiking club whose president had refused to purchase a football. In two years' time, the team had 104 players and Lozai bought its first pitch for half a French franc. In 1905, they began playing against other teams in Normandy such as Le Havre AC and SM Caen, and adopted yellow and black as their colours. The pitch was taken in 1910 to build a quarry but a local man named Albert Lebas gave the club part of his land for the Stade Porte-de-Diane, which opened in 1912. Several Quevilly players were killed in World War I.

In 1919, after the end of the war, Quevilly joined the nascent French Football Federation (FFF) and began playing in its Normandy League. In the early 1920s, it signed six British players. In the 1926–27 Coupe de France, the team beat Amiens, neighbours Rouen, Suisse Paris and Stade Raphaëlois to make the final where they lost 3–0 to Marseille at the Stade Olympique in Colombes. It was the first such final to be attended by a President of France, namely Gaston Doumergue. The team became dominant in Normandy in the 1930s as Le Havre and Rouen turned professional and played in national leagues. In October 1944, shortly after the Normandy landings, Quevilly played a match against the British Royal Marines for the benefit of player Henri Mallet who had lost his arm in the conflict.

Quevilly won France's amateur championship in 1954, 1955 and 1958. The following year, co-founder and chairman Lozai died, with his widow Micheline inheriting the team. In 1970, the FFF expanded Division 2 with several leading amateur teams including Quevilly, whose opponents included the newly founded Paris Saint-Germain. Michel Tron-Lozai, grandson of the founder, was unable to afford the lighting to permit the team to stay in the division, resulting in a return to amateur football in 1972.

Refoundation and second cup final

In January 1979, local man Robert Beauchamp refounded US Quevilly but failed in a bid to have the team restored to the second division, instead being placed in the fourth division of the department of Seine-Maritime, the 10th and lowest possible tier. The team got back to the fifth-tier Championnat de France Amateur 2 in 2000, and reached the last 16 of the 2004–05 Coupe de France, losing 2–0 at Ligue 2 club Sedan. In the 2009–10 edition, the now fourth-tier team won 1–0 against Ligue 1 club Rennes in the last 16 with a goal from Gregory Beaugrard, followed by a 3–1 home win over another top-flight team Boulogne in the quarter-finals. The run ended in the semi-finals against PSG on 14 April 2010 at Caen's Stade Michel d'Ornano, Mevlüt Erdinç scoring the only goal for the Parisians.

In the 2011–12 Coupe de France, Quevilly won 3–2 against manager Didier Deschamps' Marseille in the quarter-finals, again at Caen, with two extra-time goals by John-Christophe Ayina. The semi-final at the same ground was won 2–1 over Rennes to put Quevilly in the final for the first time in 85 years, and making them the first amateurs in the final since Amiens in 2001. Lyon won the final, with a first-half goal by Lisandro López.

Union and promotions
In April 2015, US Quevilly joined with FC Rouen to form US Quevilly-Rouen Métropole, taking the place of US Quevilly in the fourth-tierChampionnat de France Amateur for the 2015–16 season. The collaboration was initiated by the Métropole Rouen Normandie, who provided €200,000 of its €1.5 million budget, with the aim of promotion to the Championnat National within two years and Ligue 2 within three to five. As Quevilly was ranked two divisions higher than Rouen, it provided the president, manager and most players, while playing at Rouen's Stade Robert Diochon; both clubs continued to exist independently. The team initially played home games in Rouen's red with trim of Quevilly's yellow, and the inverse away from home.

The new team won Group A of the 2015–16 Championnat de France amateur, gaining promotion to the 2016–17 Championnat National. As runners-up to Châteauroux, they achieved instant promotion again to the 2017–18 Ligue 2. Beginning the season playing home games in front of low crowds at the Stade Marie-Marvingt in Le Mans due to works on the Stade Robert Diochin, the team were relegated back. Rouen ended its involvement in the team in June 2018.

Promotion back to Ligue 2 was secured on 28 April 2021, after other results ensured the club a top-two finish in the 2020–21 Championnat National behind SC Bastia and at the expense of Villefranche.

Coaching Staff

Squad

Out on loan

Honours

National

 Finalist of Coupe de France in 1927, 2012
 Semi-finalist of Coupe de France: 1968, 2010
 Champion de France Amateur: 1954, 1955, 1958, 1967
 Champion du Groupe Ouest: 1954, 1955, 1956, 1959, 1966, 1967
 Champion du Groupe Nord: 1958, 1963, 1964, 1969
 Champion du Groupe A: 2011
 Champion de France Amateur Runner-up: 1959, 1963
 Division 3
 Finalist: 1973
 Champion du Groupe Ouest: 1973

Youth
 Coupe Gambardella
 Champion: 1967
 Runner-up: 1960

References

External links

  

 
Association football clubs established in 1902
1902 establishments in France
Sport in Seine-Maritime
Football clubs in France
Football clubs in Normandy